Tedesco (or Todesco, or Todisco; plural "Tedeschi") is an Italian word for "German". Etymologically, it derives from Theodiscus, sharing the same root of German "Deutsch", it is derived from “Teutonic”. Both Tedesco and Tedeschi are common surnames among Italians, both in Italy and in the diaspora. The surname and its variants means someone from Germany.  The surname is also listed as a common Jewish surname in Italy (like "Deutsch" in Germany). Paul Johnson notes that the 'Natione Tedesca' described Jews of German origin, being among the three Jewish ethnic divisions resident in mid-16th-century Venice.

People
People with the surname Tedesco
 Domenico Tedesco (born 1985), German-Italian football manager
 Edward Francis Tedesco, American planetary scientist at JPL
 Elena Tedesco (born 1991), Nuestra Belleza El Salvador 2009
 Francis J. Tedesco (c. born 1943), American medical professor
 Giovanni Tedesco (born 1972), Italian footballer, brother of Giacomo
 Giacomo Tedesco (born 1976), Italian footballer, brother of Giovanni
 James Tedesco (born 1993), Australian-Italian Rugby League player
 Johann Paul Schor (1616–1674), Austrian artist, also known as Giovanni Paolo Tedesco
 Juan Carlos Tedesco (born 1944), Argentine Minister of Education
 Mario Castelnuovo-Tedesco (1895–1968), Italian composer
 Manoah Leide-Tedesco (1895–1982), Italian composer / conductor
 Paola Tedesco (born 1952), Italian actress, daughter of Sergio
 Sergio Tedesco (1928–2012), Italian actor / voice actor / tenor, father of Paola
 Tommy Tedesco (1930–1997), American musician

People with the surname Tedisco
 Jim Tedisco (born 1950), American politician

People with the surname Todisco
 Salvatore Todisco (1961–1990), Italian boxer
 Settimio Todisco (born 1924), Italian Catholic bishop

See also
 Tedesco (disambiguation)
 Tedeschi (surname)

Surnames meaning "German" of different origins:

 Aleman (Spanish and others)
 Douch (English)
 Němec (Czech)
 Németh (Hungarian)

References
 

Surnames
Italian-language surnames
Italian people of German descent
Ethnonymic surnames
Jewish surnames